Fevziye can refer to:

 Fevziye, Düzce
 Fevziye, Gemlik
 Fevziye, İnegöl